Pavithran a/l K. Selladoria (born 14 September 1994) is a Malaysian footballer who plays as a defender for Perak in the Malaysia Super League.

References

External links
 

1994 births
Living people
Malaysian footballers
Malaysian people of Indian descent
Association football defenders
Malaysia Super League players
Malaysia Premier League players
MOF F.C. players
Perak F.C. players